Don LePan (born 1954 in Washington, DC) is widely known as a book publisher; he is the founder and CEO of the academic publishing house Broadview Press. He is also a painter and the author or editor of several books, most notably the dystopian novel Animals.

Biography

LePan grew up in Ontario, living variously in Ottawa, Kingston, and Toronto. He received a BA in English Literature from Carleton University in Ottawa and an MA in Renaissance Studies from the University of Sussex, where he studied under A.D. Nuttall; his research on Shakespeare’s plots became the basis for a monograph (The Birth of Expectation). He worked for some years in the 1970s and 1980s for the Canadian branch of Oxford University Press (where he was manager of the College Department from 1979-1982), and from 1982-1985 as a secondary school teacher in rural Zimbabwe with the development agency WUSC. In 1985 he returned to Canada to found Broadview Press, a book publisher in the humanities and social sciences. By 2020 Broadview had grown to a company with annual revenues of over $4 million and a staff of 30.  Though modest in size, the publishing house is held in high regard, particularly as a publisher of anthologies and literary editions; in 2004 LePan was awarded an honorary doctorate by Trent University in Peterborough, Ontario for his contribution to academic publishing.

LePan’s father, Douglas LePan, was well known as a poet and academic; his brother, Nicholas Le Pan, is well known as a Canadian civil servant (he is a former head of the Office of the Superintendent of Financial Institutions).

Animals: A Novel

LePan’s Animals: A Novel is set in an indeterminate future in which virtually all the species that humans have used as food have become extinct; it tells the story of a "mongrel" child who is twice abandoned and then comes face to face with the equivalent in this future world of the factory farming of today. The novel was published in 2009 in Canada and in 2010 in the USA, to sparse but generally favorable newspaper reviews  —and to widely diverging reactions elsewhere. Notably enthusiastic was a review in the University of Toronto Quarterly ("If you read nothing else from this year's batch of novels, ... read Animals". Few Canadian novels have been as powerful").  Others, however, have criticized the work as being "didactic" or "preachy." On his blog LePan has defended the notion that the aesthetic and moral need not be regarded as mutually exclusive—in his words, "it should not be assumed that a work that tries to do good cannot also be good."

LePan's third novel, Lucy and Bonbon, also concerns the lines that we draw between humans and other animals.

Selected works

The Birth of Expectation. Macmillan Press, 1989. Paperback published by Broadview Press, 1996 (The Cognitive Revolution in Western Culture). 

The Broadview Guide to Writing (co-author). Peterborough: Broadview Press, 6/e edition 2015. 

The Broadview Anthology of British Literature (co-edited). Peterborough: Broadview Press, 1/e 2006 (six volumes).

The Broadview Anthology of Expository Prose (co-edited). Peterborough: Broadview Press, 2/e edition 2011. 

Animals: A Novel. Montreal: Véhicule Press, 2009.  . Berkeley: Soft Skull Press, 2010. 

The Broadview Pocket Glossary of Literary Terms (co-author). Peterborough: Broadview Press, 2013. 

Rising Stories: A Novel. Nanaimo: Press Forward (distributed by Broadview Press), 2015. 

How to be Good with Words (co-author). Peterborough: Broadview Press, 2017. 

Lucy and Bonbon: A Novel. Toronto: MiroLand (Guernica), 2022. ISBN 978-1-77183-718-7

References 

Canadian book publishers (people)
Living people
1954 births
American emigrants to Canada